Tumin Lingee Legislative Assembly constituency is one of the 32 Legislative Assembly constituencies of Sikkim state in India. It lies half in East Sikkim district and half in South Sikkim district.

This constituency is reserved for members of the Bhutia-Lepcha community.

Member of the Legislative Assembly

Election results

2019

See also
 List of constituencies of the Sikkim Legislative Assembly
 East Sikkim district
 South Sikkim district

References

Gangtok district
Namchi district
Assembly constituencies of Sikkim